The David M. Buck House is a historic house located near Bald Mountain, Yancey County, North Carolina.

Description and history 
It was built about 1904, and is a large two-story, Colonial Revival style frame dwelling. The front facade features an expansive one-story porch supported by turned columns. Other contributing resources on the property are stone walls, three domestic outbuildings (spring house, apple house, and wood shed), a store, and the family cemetery (1938).

It was listed on the National Register of Historic Places on April 25, 2001.

References 

Houses on the National Register of Historic Places in North Carolina
Colonial Revival architecture in North Carolina
Houses completed in 1904
Houses in Yancey County, North Carolina
National Register of Historic Places in Yancey County, North Carolina